Northwest Local School District is a public school district in Hamilton County, Ohio, near Cincinnati, Ohio.  It primarily serves Colerain Township, but also includes parts of neighboring Green Township, Springfield Township, and Ross Township.

The school board's general offices are located at 3240 Banning Road in Colerain Township. The district has over 10,000 students and more than 1,200 employees. The district was rated "EXCELLENT" for the 2008/2009 school year by the Ohio Department of Education.

The district was the owner of WNSD, a noncommercial radio station that lasted between 1972 and 1978.

Schools

Elementary Schools (K-5)
 Colerain 
 Monfort Heights
 Struble
 Taylor
 Pleasant Run

Middle Schools (6-8)
 Colerain 
 Pleasant Run 
 White Oak

High Schools (9-12)
Colerain High School
Northwest High School

References

External links
 http://www.nwlsd.org/

Education in Hamilton County, Ohio
School districts in Ohio